Bumehen District is in Pardis County, Tehran province, Iran. At the 2006 and 2011 National Censuses, its constituent parts were in the Central District of Tehran County. The cities of Bumahen and Pardis, and most of Siyahrud Rural District separated from Tehran County on 29 December 2012 to establish Pardis County. At the latest census in 2016, the district had 159,184 inhabitants in 50,482 households.

References 

Pardis County

Districts of Tehran Province

Populated places in Tehran Province

Populated places in Pardis County

Populated places established in 2012

2012 establishments in Iran